Wallingford Bridge is a medieval road bridge over the River Thames in England which connects Wallingford and Crowmarsh Gifford, Oxfordshire (Wallingford was historically in Berkshire until 1974 reorganization). It crosses the Thames on the reach between Cleeve Lock and Benson Lock. It is a scheduled monument. Since the  construction of the southern Wallingford bypass in 1993, most traffic crossing the Thames at the town uses Winterbrook Bridge.

History
The first reference to a bridge across the Thames between Wallingford and Crowmarsh Gifford is from 1141, when King Stephen besieged Wallingford Castle. The first stone bridge is credited to Richard, 1st Earl of Cornwall, and four remaining arches are believed to contain 13th century elements.  Major repairs used stone from the dissolved Holy Trinity Priory in 1530. Four arches were removed so a drawbridge could be inserted during the siege of the castle in the Civil War of 1646, and these were replaced with timber structures until repair in 1751. Following a flood, three arches were rebuilt by Richard Clarke from 1810–1812 to a design by John Treacher (1760–1836) developed in 1809, and a parapet and balustrade added.

Bench marks
There are three Ordnance Survey bench marks on the bridge. A cut mark over the centre of the river on the south parapet, another cut mark near the east end of the bridge on the north parapet and a flush bracket numbered 11 used during the second geodetic levelling of England and Wales close to the river bank on the south side of the bridge.

See also
Crossings of the River Thames

References

External links
 Wallingford History Gateway
 Where Thames Smooth Waters Glide: Images of Wallingford Bridge

Bridges across the River Thames
Bridges in Oxfordshire
History of Berkshire
Bridges completed in 1812
Wallingford, Oxfordshire
Grade II* listed buildings in Oxfordshire
Grade II* listed bridges in England
Road bridges in England